Belton O'Neal Compton Jr. (February 5, 1951 – February 18, 2019) was an American actor and director.

Early life 
He was born in Sumter, South Carolina, the son of educators Belton O. Compton Sr. and Dorothy Brunson Compton.

O'Neal Compton was best known as a character actor in films and television, such as Life, Nixon, Nell, Primary Colors, Deep Impact, Seinfeld and Big Eden. He was also an award-winning writer, producer, photographer and commercial director.

O'Neal's photography was featured in exhibitions at the Michael Hoppen Gallery (London), Castle Haggenberg (Vienna) and in private galleries in Los Angeles, New York, Chicago, New Orleans and South Carolina. His photographs hang in the collections of many celebrities including Morgan Freeman, Johnny Depp, Billy Bob Thornton, Sir Anthony Hopkins, Sharon Stone, Elizabeth Taylor, John Travolta, Emma Thompson and Oliver Stone. O'Neal was commissioned by Jerry Seinfeld to create a series of his "slow speed" natural light portraits of the cast and crew in the last year of his show.

O'Neal attended Clemson University, for a year. Then, after a four-year stint in the United States Navy, he enrolled at Wofford College and "fell in love with campus life again". He coached football under the watchful eye of Coach Buddy Sasser and Coach Ladson Cubbage. O'Neal's major field of study was biology, which he read every week, even forty years later, but his passion was the theatre. In 1977, O'Neal discovered the Wofford Theatre Workshop, under the direction of Dr. James Gross. 

O'Neal made his living as a film and television actor, screenwriter and photographer, and also as a commercial producer and director. His work took him to many places in the Americas and Europe. He lived in New York, Los Angeles, Buenos Aires, São Paulo, Rio de Janeiro and Florianópolis, Brazil, and spent months working and living in some of the world’s great cities: London, Dublin, Paris, Vienna, Zurich and Mondello, Sicily.

He wrote screenplays and worked with his publisher and editor to complete a book about his life and travels.

Death
On February 18, 2019, he died at the Dorn Veterans Affairs Medical Center in Columbia, South Carolina. He was 68 years old. The cause of death was yet to be determined.

Filmography
Kill Me Later (2001) - Agent McGinley
Picking Up the Pieces (2000) - Texas John
Big Eden (2000) - Jim Soams
Life (1999/I) - Superintendent Abernathy
Party of Five (1998) (TV series) - Les (1 episode)
Deep Impact (1998) - Morten Entrekin
LateLine (1998) (TV series) - Harlan (1 episode)
Primary Colors (1998) - Sailorman Shoreson
Orleans (1997) (TV series) - Lawyer Curtis Manzant (5 episodes)
Seinfeld (1995–1997) (TV series) - Earl Haffler (2 episodes)
Diabolique (1996) - Irv Danziger
Shaughnessy (1996) (TV) -
Nixon (1995) - Texas Man
The Single Guy (1995) (TV series) - TY (1 episode)
Coach (1995) (TV series) - Hal (1 episode)
Lois & Clark: The New Adventures of Superman (1995) (TV series) - Gene Newtrich (1 episode)
Nell (1994) - Don Fontana, Lovell's Attorney
Roadracers (1994) (TV) - J.T.
Rebel Highway (1994) (TV series) - J.T. (1 episode)
Little Big League (1994) - Major League Umpire
Murder Between Friends (1994) (TV) - Det. Easby
Grace Under Fire (1993) (TV series) - Doctor (1 episode)
Attack of the 50 Ft. Woman (1993) (TV) - Sheriff Denby
Harts of the West (1993) (TV series) - (episode "The Right Stuff")
The Thing Called Love (1993) - Singing Cop
What's Love Got to Do with It (1993) - George (the Ramada Inn Manager)
Made in America (1993) - Rocky
When Love Kills: The Seduction of John Hearn (1993) (TV) - Minister
The Positively True Adventures of the Alleged Texas Cheerleader-Murdering Mom (1993) (TV) - Principal James Barker
The Wonder Years (1993) (TV series) - Zeke (1 episode)
Home Improvement (1993) (TV series) - Phil (1 episode)
Delta (1992) (TV series) - Mr. Boone (1 episode)
A Message from Holly (1992) (TV) - Burly Man
Parker Lewis Can't Lose (1992) (TV series) - Fez Man (1 episode)
Quantum Leap (1992) (TV series) - Russ (1 episode)
Brother Future (1991) (TV) - Turner
Don't Tell Her It's Me (1990) - Gas Station Attendant
Martin (1993) (TV series) - Trooper Williams (1 episode)

References

External links

1951 births
2019 deaths
American male film actors
American male television actors
People from Sumter, South Carolina
Male actors from South Carolina
Military personnel from South Carolina
Clemson University alumni
University of South Carolina alumni
Wofford College alumni
Writers from South Carolina